Nimrod is a tool for the parametrization of serial programs to create and execute embarrassingly parallel programs over a computational grid. It is a co-allocating, scheduling and brokering service.  Nimrod was one of the first tools to make use of heterogeneous resources in a grid for a single computation.  It was also an early example of using a market economy to perform grid scheduling.  This enables Nimrod to provide a guaranteed completion time despite using best-effort services.

The tool was created as a research project funded by the Distributed Systems Technology Centre. The principal investigator is Professor David Abramson of Monash University.

References

External links 
 Nimrod Toolkit the official Nimrod project page at Monash eScience and Grid Engineering Laboratory (MeSsAGE Lab)
 Nimrod: Tools for Distributed Parametric Modelling the former Nimrod project page at Monash University, via archive.org. Archived 22 July 2008.

Grid computing products